This is a list of 120 species in Leptocerus, a genus of long-horned caddisflies in the family Leptoceridae.

Leptocerus species

 Leptocerus agamemnon Malicky & Chantaramongkol, 1996 i c g
 Leptocerus agaue Malicky & Chantaramongkol, 1996 i c g
 Leptocerus agunachila Schmid, 1987 i c g
 Leptocerus akhunta Schmid, 1987 i c g
 Leptocerus allaeri Jacquemart, 1966 i c g
 Leptocerus americanus (Banks, 1899) i c g b
 Leptocerus amoenus (Ulmer, 1951) i c g
 Leptocerus amphioxus (Marlier, 1965) i c g
 Leptocerus anakus Gibbs, 1973 i c g
 Leptocerus anchises Malicky, 1997 i c g
 Leptocerus ankuchagraha Schmid, 1987 i c g
 Leptocerus anuradha (Schmid, 1958) i c g
 Leptocerus aprachasta Schmid, 1987 i c g
 Leptocerus argentoniger (Ulmer, 1915) i c g
 Leptocerus assimulans (Ulmer, 1916) i c g
 Leptocerus atidvaya Schmid, 1987 i c g
 Leptocerus atiraskrita Schmid, 1987 i c g
 Leptocerus atsou Schmid, 1987 i c g
 Leptocerus atyudatta Schmid, 1987 i c g
 Leptocerus australis (Marlier, 1965) i c g
 Leptocerus bahuchaka Schmid, 1987 i c g
 Leptocerus bangsaenensis Malicky & Chantaramongkol, 1991 i c g
 Leptocerus bheriensis Malicky, 1993 i c g
 Leptocerus bifascipennis (Ulmer, 1930) i c g
 Leptocerus bimaculatus (Martynov, 1936) i c g
 Leptocerus bitaenianus Yang & Morse, 2000 i c g
 Leptocerus biwae (Tsuda, 1942) i c g
 Leptocerus bosei Kimmins, 1963 i c g
 Leptocerus burmanus Kimmins, 1963 i c g
 Leptocerus canaliculatus (Ulmer, 1930) i c g
 Leptocerus cauliculus Yang & Morse, 2000 i c g
 Leptocerus chaktika Schmid, 1987 i c g
 Leptocerus charopantaja Schmid, 1987 i c g
 Leptocerus chatadalaja Schmid, 1987 i c g
 Leptocerus cheesmanae Kimmins, 1962 i c g
 Leptocerus cherrensis Kimmins, 1963 i c g
 Leptocerus chiangmaiensis Malicky & Chantaramongkol, 1991 i c g
 Leptocerus chyamavadata Schmid, 1987 i c g
 Leptocerus ciconiae Malicky, 1993 i c g
 Leptocerus circumflexus Mey, 1998 i c g
 Leptocerus cirritus Yang & Morse, 2000 i c g
 Leptocerus clavatus Kimmins, 1961 i c g
 Leptocerus clinatus Yang & Morse, 2000 i c g
 Leptocerus colophallus Yang & Morse, 1997 i c g
 Leptocerus coulibalyi Gibon, 1992 i c g
 Leptocerus datrayukta Schmid, 1987 i c g
 Leptocerus debilis (Navás, 1931) i c g
 Leptocerus dejouxi Gibon, 1984 i c g
 Leptocerus dicopennis (Hwang, 1958) i c g
 Leptocerus didymatus (Barnard, 1934) i c g
 Leptocerus diehli Malicky & Chantaramongkol, 1991 i c g
 Leptocerus dirghachuka Gordon & Schmid in Schmid, 1987 i c g
 Leptocerus foederatus (Ulmer, 1951) i c g
 Leptocerus funasiensis Kobayashi, 1985 i c g
 Leptocerus gracilis (Ulmer, 1912) i c g
 Leptocerus hamatus Yang & Morse, 2000 i c g
 Leptocerus inflatus Kimmins, 1962 i c g
 Leptocerus interruptus (Fabricius, 1775) i c g
 Leptocerus inthanonensis Malicky & Chantaramongkol, 1991 i c g
 Leptocerus intricatus (Mosely, 1939) i c g
 Leptocerus katakoroensis Gibon, 1986 i c g
 Leptocerus kchapavarna Schmid, 1987 i c g
 Leptocerus kritamukha Schmid, 1987 i c g
 Leptocerus lampunensis Malicky & Chantaramongkol, 1991 i c g
 Leptocerus lanzenbergeri Malicky & Chantaramongkol, 1991 i c g
 Leptocerus lauzannei Gibon, 1992 i c g
 Leptocerus longicornis Yang & Morse, 2000 i c g
 Leptocerus lusitanicus (McLachlan, 1884) i c g
 Leptocerus madhyamika (Schmid, 1961) i c g
 Leptocerus mahadbhuta Schmid, 1987 i c g
 Leptocerus mahasena (Schmid, 1958) i c g
 Leptocerus mahawansa (Schmid, 1958) i c g
 Leptocerus manichyana Schmid, 1987 i c g
 Leptocerus maroccanus Dakki, 1982 i c g
 Leptocerus masik Malicky, 1995 i c g
 Leptocerus mechakita Schmid, 1987 i c g
 Leptocerus mechavrichana Schmid, 1987 i c g
 Leptocerus merangirensis Malicky, 1993 i c g
 Leptocerus moselyi (Martynov, 1935) i c g
 Leptocerus mubalei (Jacquemart, 1961) i c g
 Leptocerus neavei (Mosely, 1932) i c g
 Leptocerus ophiophagi Malicky, 1993 i c g
 Leptocerus ousta Schmid, 1987 i c g
 Leptocerus parakum Chantaramongkol & Malicky, 1986 i c g
 Leptocerus pekingensis (Ulmer, 1932) i c g
 Leptocerus posticoides Malicky, 1995 i c g
 Leptocerus posticus (Banks, 1911) i c g
 Leptocerus prithudhara Schmid, 1987 i c g
 Leptocerus promkutkaewi Malicky & Chantaramongkol, 1991 i c g
 Leptocerus quilleverei Gibon, 1984 i c g
 Leptocerus rectus Kimmins, 1956 i c g
 Leptocerus sadbhuta Schmid, 1987 i c g
 Leptocerus sakantaka Schmid, 1987 i c g
 Leptocerus samchita Schmid, 1987 i c g
 Leptocerus samnata Schmid, 1987 i c g
 Leptocerus sarchtika Schmid, 1987 i c g
 Leptocerus sechani Gibon, 1992 i c g
 Leptocerus senarius Yang & Morse, 2000 i c g
 Leptocerus sibuyanus Malicky, 1993 i c g
 Leptocerus similis (McLachlan, 1875) i c g
 Leptocerus sinuosus Gibbs, 1973 i c g
 Leptocerus souta Mosely in Mosely & Kimmins, 1953 i c g
 Leptocerus speciosus Kimmins, 1956 i c g
 Leptocerus stephanei Gibon, 1992 i c g
 Leptocerus sudhara Schmid, 1987 i c g
 Leptocerus sukhabaddha Schmid, 1987 i c g
 Leptocerus suthepensis Malicky & Chantaramongkol, 1991 i c g
 Leptocerus sylvaticus Gibon, 1984 i c g
 Leptocerus taianae Gibon, 1992 i c g
 Leptocerus tayaledra Malicky, 1979 i c g
 Leptocerus telimelensis Gibon, 1992 i c g
 Leptocerus tineiformis Curtis, 1834 i c g
 Leptocerus tungyawensis Malicky & Chantaramongkol, 1991 i c g
 Leptocerus tursiops Malicky, 1979 i c g
 Leptocerus ukchatara Schmid, 1987 i c g
 Leptocerus ultimus Mey, 1998 i c g
 Leptocerus vakrita Schmid, 1987 i c g
 Leptocerus valvatus (Martynov, 1935) i c g
 Leptocerus wangtakraiensis Malicky & Chantaramongkol, 1991 i c g
 Leptocerus wanleelagi Malicky & Chantaramongkol, 1991 i c g

Data sources: i = ITIS, c = Catalogue of Life, g = GBIF, b = Bugguide.net

References

Leptocerus
Articles created by Qbugbot